Sofía Silva may refer to:

Sofia Silva (murder victim) (died 1996), American girl kidnapped and murdered by Richard Evonitz in 1996
Sofía Silva (basketball, born 1990), Portuguese player in 2019 and EuroBasket Women 2021 qualification